Over the Years and Through the Woods is the title of a live album and video by Queens of the Stone Age.
The release features material on audio CD as well as video DVD—both recorded at London's Brixton Academy on Monday August 22, 2005 and KOKO on Tuesday August 23, 2005. Over the Years and Through the Woods is sold as two different packages—either a CD case or a DVD case. Both versions include the same content on the discs. The cover art includes an assortment of stylized letter Q's, which the band has used on the covers of previous studio albums (specifically, the blue Q is from Rated R, the red Q is from Songs for the Deaf, and the yellow Q from Lullabies to Paralyze). The title font on the cover was taken from their self-titled album. The DVD content was directed by Chapman Baehler.

Track listing

Live CD
  "Go with the Flow" – 2:58 (from Songs for the Deaf, 2002)
  "Regular John" – 5:24 (from Queens of the Stone Age, 1998)
  "Monsters in the Parasol" – 4:39 (from Rated R, 2000)
  "Tangled Up in Plaid" – 4:00 (from Lullabies to Paralyze, 2005)
  "Little Sister" – 2:51 (from Lullabies to Paralyze)
  "You Can't Quit Me Baby" – 9:49 (from Queens of the Stone Age)
  "I Wanna Make It wit Chu" – 4:27 (from Volumes 9 & 10 of The Desert Sessions, 2003; Era Vulgaris, 2007)
  "Leg of Lamb" – 3:34 (from Rated R)
  "I Think I Lost My Headache" – 5:24 (from Rated R)
  "Mexicola" – 5:09 (from Queens of the Stone Age)
  "Burn the Witch" – 3:12 (from Lullabies to Paralyze)
  "Song for the Dead" – 7:47 (from Songs for the Deaf)
  "No One Knows" – 7:47 (from Songs for the Deaf)
  "Long Slow Goodbye" – 7:20 (from Lullabies to Paralyze)

DVD
The title song is "Spiders and Vinegaroons" (from the Kyuss/Queens of the Stone Age split EP, 1997)
  "This Lullaby" – 2:40 (from Lullabies to Paralyze)
  "Go with the Flow" – 3:12 (from Songs for the Deaf)
  "Feel Good Hit of the Summer" – 3:41 (from Rated R)
  "The Lost Art of Keeping a Secret" – 3:44 (from Rated R)
  "Regular John" – 5:30 (from Queens of the Stone Age)
  "Song for the Deaf" – 5:09 (from Songs for the Deaf)
  "Avon" – 3:33 (from Queens of the Stone Age)
  "Little Sister" – 2:52 (from Lullabies to Paralyze)
  "You Can't Quit Me Baby" – 10:27 (from Queens of the Stone Age)
  "I Wanna Make It wit Chu" – 5:10 (from Volumes 9 & 10 of The Desert Sessions and Era Vulgaris)
  "Monsters in the Parasol" – 3:16 (from Rated R)
  "The Fun Machine Took a Shit & Died" – 6:41 (Outtake from Lullabies to Paralyze and Era Vulgaris)
  "Mexicola" – 5:17 (from Queens of the Stone Age)
  "Burn the Witch" – 4:37 (from Lullabies to Paralyze)
  "Covered in Punk's Blood" – 1:57 (from Volumes 9 & 10 of The Desert Sessions)
  "I Think I Lost My Headache" – 5:07 (from Rated R)
  "Song for the Dead" – 8:16 (from Songs for the Deaf)
  "I Never Came" – 5:54 (from Lullabies to Paralyze)
  "No One Knows" – 8:09 (from Songs for the Deaf)
  "Long Slow Goodbye" – 7:44 (from Lullabies to Paralyze)
  Credits/"First It Giveth" (from Songs for the Deaf)

Bonus
There are 13 bonus songs, recorded at various locations during each of four tours, split into the following sections: (all songs from said album unless noted)
  Queens of the Stone Age
  "The Bronze" – 3:38 (from The Split CD EP split with Beaver, 1998)
  "Mexicola" – 5:34
  Rated R
  "Better Living Through Chemistry" – 5:54
  "Auto Pilot" – 4:19
  "How to Handle a Rope" – 3:29 (from Queens of the Stone Age)
  Songs for the Deaf
  "Quick and to the Pointless" – 1:34 (from Rated R)
  "You Think I Ain't Worth a Dollar, But I Feel Like a Millionaire" – 2:36
  "God is in the Radio" – 11:19
  "Song for the Dead" – 6:09
  "Regular John" – 2:02 (from Queens of the Stone Age)
  "Hanging Tree" – 3:16
  Lullabies to Paralyze
  "Precious and Grace" – 3:33
  "Burn the Witch" – 2:41

Personnel
 Josh Homme – lead vocals, guitar, bass
 Troy Van Leeuwen – guitar, lap steel, bass, backing vocals
 Alain Johannes – bass, guitar, backing vocals
 Joey Castillo – drums, percussion
 Natasha Shneider – keyboards, backing vocals

Notes
 The atmospheric song played in the main menu is a Queens of the Stone Age track, "Spiders and Vinegaroons" from the split EP Kyuss/Queens of the Stone Age (1997).
 The song "The Fun Machine Took a Shit & Died" was initially slated to be included on Lullabies to Paralyze but was misplaced. During that time, the band assumed that the tapes of that song were either lost or stolen.
"The tapes got lost. Actually, they were just at another studio, but we falsely accused everyone in the world of theft." (Josh Homme, 09/2005, RollingStone.com, article linked below)
 During every weekend in the month of November 2005, DirecTV aired an edited version of the main feature DVD content on their "freeview" channel to promote the DVD/CD release on November 22, 2005. The songs that were removed for time constraints were: "Feel Good Hit of the Summer", "The Lost Art of Keeping a Secret", "The Fun Machine Took a Shit and Died", "I Think I Lost My Headache" and "I Never Came". The edited version also censored some explicit language and brief nudity from the program.
 There is a hidden audio commentary for the bonus footage. It features comments from the entire band (Josh Homme, Joey Castillo, Alain Johannes, Troy Van Leeuwen and Natasha Shneider) and was recorded on October 1, 2005 on the day of their performance as the opening act for Nine Inch Nails at the Hollywood Bowl. It is accessible by entering the Sound Options menu in the Bonus section and turning on the French subtitles, or by switching the audio track while watching the footage.
 Although credits for the bonus tracks were not included, two songs from the Rated R section ("Better Living Through Chemistry" and "Auto Pilot") were recorded at the Newport Music Hall in Columbus, Ohio on October 4, 2000 — not "somewhere in Europe" as surmised by Homme in the bonus clip commentary. These tracks were recorded and edited by Sie Callebs and John Waters.

Charts

Album

DVD

Certifications

References

External links
 Official promo (requires Flash)
 Rolling Stone Magazine news article, 09/2005
 Undercover.com.au news article
 Universal-rock.de news article containing the DVD track listing (DE)

Queens of the Stone Age albums
Albums produced by Josh Homme
2005 live albums
2005 video albums
Live video albums